The Boston Storm are a United Women's Lacrosse League (UWLX) professional women's field lacrosse team based in Boston, Massachusetts.  They have played in the UWLX since the 2016 season.  In the 2017 season, the four teams in the UWLX played in a barnstorming format, with all four teams playing at a single venue.

Franchise History
The Boston Storm is one of the original four teams of the United Women's Lacrosse League (UWXL). UWLX was founded by Digit Murphy and Aronda Kirby in a strategic partnership with STX.

On February 23, 2016, Bowen Holden was named as the first general manager in franchise history. On March 17, 2016, Amy Patton was announced as the Storm's first head coach.

The first game in franchise history took place on May 28, 2016 at Goodman Stadium at Lehigh University in Bethlehem, Pennsylvania. Opposing the Philadelphia Force, Boston prevailed by a 16–8 tally. The team's first-ever goal was scored by Kailah Kempney, with Danielle Estrasco logging the assist. Liz Hogan served as the starting goaltender, requiring just nine saves for the win.

On April 13, 2017, Andrew Fink was named as the general manager of the Boston Storm, and on May 10, 2017, Abbey Capobianco was named head coach.

Roster

See also
Major League Lacrosse, the professional men's field lacrosse league in North America
National Lacrosse League, the professional men's box lacrosse league in North America
List of professional sports teams in the United States and Canada

References

 

 

United Women's Lacrosse League
Women's lacrosse teams in the United States
2015 establishments in Massachusetts
Lacrosse clubs established in 2016
Lacrosse teams in Boston
Women in Boston
Women's sports in Massachusetts